Young Fly and Flashy Vol. 1 is the first of two compilation albums by Jermaine Dupri. The album peaked at number twelve on Billboard magazine's Top R&B/Hip-Hop Albums chart and number 43 on the Billboard 200.

Track listing
"I'm Hot" (featuring Young Capone, Daz Dillinger & T-Roc) — 3:54
 "Gotta Getcha" (featuring Johnta Austin) — 2:50
 "Kodak Moment (Remix)" (featuring Kavious, Bun B & Pastor Troy) — 4:19
 "I Think They Like Me (So So Def Remix)" (featuring Dem Franchize Boyz, Da Brat & Bow Wow) — 4:43
 "So What" (featuring Cato) — 3:53
 "Throw'd Off" (featuring T. Waters) — 3:49
 "Just to Fight" (featuring Pastor Troy) — 3:41
 "Grown Man"  (featuring Miss B. & Torica) — 3:47
 "10 Toes" (featuring The Kid Slim, Daz Dillinger, J-Kwon & Stat Quo) — 3:38
 "Put Cha Hands Up" (featuring KP & Envyi) — 3:05
 "Young, Fly & Flashy" (featuring Young Capone, Midnight, Champagne Shawty & C-Dirt) (Bonus Track) — 6:58

Charts

References

2005 compilation albums
Jermaine Dupri albums
Albums produced by Jermaine Dupri
Virgin Records compilation albums